The Protocol of St. Petersburg may refer to:

Protocol of St. Petersburg (1826), an Anglo–Russian treaty about the Greek War of Independence
Protocol of St. Petersburg (1887), treaty of the Afghan Boundary Commission regarding Afghanistan's border with Russia
Protocol of St. Petersburg (1904), an international anti-anarchist treaty
Protocol of St. Petersburg (1913), a Bulgarian–Romanian treaty through which Bulgaria ceded Silistra to Romania